Miss World Zimbabwe is a Beauty pageant to select a delegate for Miss World pageant. This pageant is related to Miss Zimbabwe contest.

History
Miss Zimbabwe was founded in 1980 when the national beauty pageant was transformed from Miss Rhodesia after attaining independence. This is not just any beauty contest but that of national value.

Titleholders
Color key

The winner of Miss World Zimbabwe represents her country at Miss World. On occasion, when the winner does not qualify (due to age) for either contest, a runner-up is sent.

See also
Miss Zimbabwe

References

External links
Official page

Zimbabwe
Beauty pageants in Zimbabwe
Recurring events established in 1980
Zimbabwean awards